Ouseley or Ousley is a surname. Notable people with the surname include:

 Duncan Ouseley (born 1950), English judge
 Frederick Ouseley (1825–1889), English musician
 Gideon Ouseley (1769–1839), Anglo-Irish Methodist
 Gideon Ouseley, a pseudonym of Oliver St. John Gogarty (1878–1957)
 Gore Ouseley (1770–1844), British diplomat and linguist
 Herman Ouseley, Baron Ouseley (born 1945), British politician, author of the Ouseley Report
 William Ouseley (1769–1842), British orientalist
 William Gore Ouseley (1797–1866), British diplomat

Ousley 
 Curtis Ousley (1934–1971), American musician
 Harold Ousley (1929–2015), American jazz musician

See also 
 Mount Ousley, New South Wales, a suburb of Wollongong
 Owsley (disambiguation)